William John Duncan Spence (born 20 April 1923) is an English writer. He has written war novels as Duncan Spence, and Westerns as Jim Bowden, Floyd Rogers and Kirk Ford. He has also used the pseudonym Hannah Cooper. His most successful novels have been historical romances written under the name Jessica Blair.

Life
Spence was born in Middlesbrough in 1923. He worked as a schoolteacher from 1940 to 1943. He saw active service during World War II with Bomber Command. On 1 October 1943, he was commissioned into the Royal Air Force Volunteer Reserve as a pilot officer (on probation). His commission was confirmed and he was promoted to flying officer on 1 April 1944. He was promoted to flight lieutenant (war substantive) on 1 October 1945. He served as a bomber aimer in Avro Lancasters, completing 36 operations. He was a store manager from 1946 to 1977.

He currently lives in Ampleforth near York. He was nominated for a prize at the 2014 Romantic Novelists' Association Awards; his novel The Road Beneath Me, written under the pseudonym "Jessica Blair,"  was nominated in the Epic Romantic Novel category. Had he won, he would have been the first male writer to do so. Spence was interviewed in May 2019, at the age of 96, where he discussed his service in World War II and his love of cricket. He suggested that, despite medical problems, he did not intend to stop writing. He retired from writing in May 2020, aged 97, after suffering from a fall.

Works

References

External links
 jessicablair.co.uk
 Bill Spence, Revisiting the Jim Bowden years... Before Bill became Jessica, Black Horse Extra, December 2008-February 2009
 An Interview with Jessica Blair (aka Bill Spence) 
 Kara, Prolific Romance Novelist is Actually a Lovable Old Coot, 11 February 2013

1923 births
Living people
English writers
Western (genre) writers
English historical novelists
Royal Air Force Volunteer Reserve personnel of World War II
Royal Air Force officers